Manfred Gerstenfeld (1937 – 25 February 2021) was an Austrian-born Israeli author and chairman of the steering committee of the Jerusalem Center for Public Affairs. He founded and directed the center's post-Holocaust and anti-Semitism program.

Biography

Early life and education 
Manfred Gerstenfeld was born in Vienna, Austria, and grew up in Amsterdam where he obtained a master's degree in organic chemistry at Amsterdam University. He also studied economics at what is now Erasmus University in Rotterdam. He had a high school teaching degree in Jewish studies from the Dutch Jewish seminary. In 1999 he obtained a Ph.D. degree in environmental studies at Amsterdam University.

Career 
In 1964 he moved to Paris where he became Europe's first financial analyst specializing in the pharmaceutical industry. He moved to Israel in 1968. There he became the managing director of an economic consultancy firm partly owned by Israel's then-largest bank Bank Leumi. He was an academic reserve officer in the Israeli Army (Israel Defense Forces). Gerstenfeld was a board member of one of Israel's largest companies, the Israel Corporation and several other Israeli companies.

In the opinion of Ha'aretz journalist Anshel Pfeffer, writing in 2013, Gerstenfeld "is without doubt the greatest authority on anti-Semitism today."  Isi Leibler, the former chairman of the Governing Board of the World Jewish Congress, wrote in The Jerusalem Post in 2015: "Gerstenfeld would today...be considered the most qualified analyst of contemporary anti-Semitism with a focus on anti-Israelism." 

Gerstenfeld was an editor of The Jewish Political Studies Review, co-publisher of the Jerusalem Letter/Viewpoints, Post-Holocaust and Anti-Semitism and Changing Jewish Communities and a member of the council of the Foundation for Research of Dutch Jewry, of which he was formerly the vice-chairman. He was chairman of the Board of the Jerusalem Center for Public Affairs, a Jerusalem-based think tank, from 2000 until 2012, where he headed the Institute for Jewish Global Affairs. 

He is the 2012 recipient of the Lifetime Achievement Award of the Journal for the Study of Antisemitism.  In 2015, he received the International Leadership Award from the Simon Wiesenthal Center. In 2019, Gerstenfeld received the International Lion of Judah Award from the Canadian Institute of Jewish Research in recognition of him as the leading international scholar on contemporary antisemitism.

Death 
Gerstenfeld died on 25 February 2021 in Jerusalem. He is survived by his two sons, Dan and Alon.

Positions on anti-Semitism

Europe 
Extrapolating from a 2011 study that showed respondents agreed at a high rate with the statement of "Israel is carrying out a war of extermination against the Palestinians", Gerstenfeld concluded that some 150 million, out of 400 million, EU citizens espouse a view that demonizes Israel. According to Gerstenfeld, Holocaust inversion is a mainstream phenomenon in the European Union.

Norway 
Norway has a population of approximately 700 Jews. Gerstenfeld argued that it is a major purveyor of anti-Semitism. and posted on his blog an interview with Hanne Nabintu Herland which says that Norway is the most anti-Semitic country in the West. 

In 2009, The Jerusalem Post carried a report asserting there was an increase in Norwegian anti-Semitism and cited a protest led by Minister of Finance Kristin Halvorsen in which chants of "Death to the Jews!" were heard. Gerstenfeld said that "It gets deep at the heart of Norway's emotional anti-Semitism. The current wave of anti-Semitism shows what people have been holding inside them". Norway's TV 2 subsequently reported that Gerstenfeld said "Norwegians are a barbaric and unintelligent people". Gerstenfeld also accused Erik Fosse and Mads Gilbert, doctors who served in Gazan hospitals during the 2008-2009 War between Israel and the Gaza Strip, of financing Hamas.

Holocaust survivor Imre Hercz criticized Gerstenfeld's "propaganda war against Norway", querying his objectivity and noting that Gerstenfeld had visited Norway only once at that time. When Gerstenfeld was questioned by Jewish community leader Anne Sender about the effect his book about Norwegian anti-Semitism might have on the Jewish minority in the country, he is reported as replying, "I couldn't care less about the Jewish Community in Norway, all I care about is to get your Jens, Jonas and Kristin off the back of my Prime Minister". 

In 2011 Gerstenfeld warned that an investigation into antisemitism in Norway by the Center for Studies of the Holocaust and Religious Minorities was likely to minimize the extent of the problem in Norway and that the center would lose credibility. In response, Odd-Bjørn Fure, genocide authority and the director of the center, said that Gerstenfeld "is not worth arguing against. I prefer to deal with serious people. We do not take this person seriously."

After three Norwegian universities declined an offer by Alan Dershowitz (who agreed to waive his fees for the occasion) to deliver lectures on Israel, Gerstenfeld said that Norway's elite is permeated with Israel-haters. Kristina Fumes writing in Ynet, responded that the topic of Scandinavian anti-Semitism in Israel's English-language media was being hijacked by extremists and that studies show Norway ranks between England and Holland. While 11% of Norwegians displayed anti-Semitic attitudes, 92% thought children should be taught about the Shoah. According to Gerstenfeld, the study itself is flawed due to the lack of inclusion of Muslim respondents and that while the English conclusions stated that a "limited" degree of anti-Semitism similar to the UK exists, the study's own data states that 38% consider Israeli actions as similar to Nazi Germany, which he took to be an example of Holocaust inversion and, if so, would be anti-Semitic according to the Working Definition of Antisemitism. By his own extrapolation Gerstenfeld said that Norway has approximately 1.5 million anti-Semites, whom he defined as "ideological criminals".

"Ideological" movements 
In 2019, Gerstenfeld warned against growing "anti-Israel sentiment" in what he called "ideological" movements, including the human rights movement, feminism, the LGBTQ community, postcolonialism, intersectionality, "extreme veganism", the anti-nuclear movement, and the climate movement.

Boycott, Divestment and Sanctions (BDS) in academia 
Against academics who support the Boycott, Divestment and Sanctions campaign against Israel, Gerstenfeld recommended a tactic of professionally discrediting them by publicizing flaws such as plagiarism in their academic works, rather than engaging them in political debates.

Jews who criticize Israel 
Gerstenfeld denounced Jews who criticize Israel, in particular US Democratic presidential candidate Bernie Sanders, as "masochists" and "useful idiots for Israel’s enemies".

Publications

Books
Revaluing Italy  with Lorenzo Necci (Italian) (1992) 
Environment and Confusion: An Introduction to a Messy Subject (1993) 
The State as a Business: Do-It-Yourself Political Forecasting (Italian) (1994) 
Israel’s New Future Interviews (1994)  
Judaism, Environmentalism and the Environment (1998) (PhD thesis) 
The Environment in the Jewish Tradition: A Sustainable World (Hebrew) (2002) 
Europe’s Crumbling Myths: The Post-Holocaust Origins of Today’s Anti-Semitism (Foreword by Emil L. Fackenheim) (2003) 
The New Clothes of European Anti-Semitism  (French)(2004), co-edited  with Shmuel Trigano 
American Jewry's Challenge: Conversations Confronting the Twenty-first Century (Foreword by Jonathan Sarna) (2004) 
Israel and Europe: An Expanding Abyss? (2005) 
European-Israeli Relations: Between Confusion and Change? (2006) 
Israel at the Polls 2006 with Shmuel Sandler and Jonathan Rynhold (2008) 
Academics against Israel and the Jews.  (Foreword by Natan Sharansky) (2007) 
Behind the Humanitarian Mask: The Nordic Countries, Israel, and the Jews (Foreword by Gert Weisskirchen)(2008) 
The Abuse of Holocaust Memory: Distortions and Responses (Foreword by Abraham H. Foxman) (2009) 
Anti-Semitism in Norway: Behind the Humanitarian Mask (Foreword by Finn Jarle Saele) (Norwegian) (2010) 
American Jewry's Comfort Level: Present and Future with Steven Bayme (Foreword by David A. Harris) (2010) 
Israel at the Polls 2009 with Shmuel Sandler and Hillel Frisch (2010) 
Het Verval. Joden in een stuurloos Nederland (The Decay. Jews in a Rudderless Netherlands) (Dutch) (2010) 
Judging the Netherlands:the Renewed Holocaust Restitution Process 1997-2000 (Foreword by Stuart E. Eizenstat) (2011) 
Demonizing Israel and the Jews. (Foreword by Rabbi Marvin Hier) (2013) 
Postwar Jewish Displacement and Rebirth (with: Françoise S. Ouzan) (2014) 
The war of a million cuts (foreword by Jose Maria Aznar) (2015) 
Israel at the Polls 2013: Continuity and Change in Israeli Political Culture.  (with Eithan Orkibi) (2015) 
Israel at the Polls 2015: A moment of transformative stability.  (with Eithan Orkibi) (2017) 
Anti-Israelism and Antisemitism. (Foreword by Edna Brocke) (German) (2018) 
Veerkracht [Resilience] with Wendy Cohen Wierda (Foreword by Chief Rabbi Binyomin Jacobs) (Dutch) (2019)

Articles
The Gaza War and the New Outburst of Anti-Semitism
Symbolic and Other Roles of Jews in Dutch Society
Ahmadinejad Calls for Israel's Elimination and Declares War on the West: A Case Study of Incitement to Genocide
The Mahathir Affair: A Case Study In Mainstream Islamic Anti-Semitism
Srebrenica: The Dutch Sabra and Shatilla
The Mohammed-Cartoon Controversy, Israel, and the Jews: A Case Study
European Politics: Double Standards Toward Israel
The Twenty-first-century Total War Against Israel and the Jews Part One and  Part Two
Various articles on Jewish Environmental Perspectives.
Continuing to Distort the Holocaust: 2009-2011*The Abuse of Holocaust Memory in 2011-2012.
Anti-Semitism and Anti-Israelism in Western Schools
Anti-Semitism and Anti-Israelism in Dutch Schools
The Gaza Flotilla: Facts and Official Reactions

Book reviews by Manfred Gerstenfeld
Joop den Uyl 1919-1987: Dromer en doordouwer (Joop den Uyl 1919-1987: Dreamer and Pusher) by Anet Bleich
Never Again, Yet Again by Stephen D. Smith
The Prime Ministers: An Intimate Narrative on Israeli Leadership, by Yehuda Avner
Hugo Logtenberg and Marcel Wiegman, Job Cohen – Burgemeester van Nederland

References

External links
Author: Dr. Manfred Gerstenfeld at the website of the Jerusalem Center for Public Affairs

1937 births
2021 deaths
Austrian Jews
Dutch emigrants to Israel
Israeli businesspeople
Israeli economists
Israeli non-fiction writers
Israeli Jews
Israeli people of Austrian-Jewish descent
Scientists from Amsterdam
Scholars of antisemitism
University of Amsterdam alumni
Multilingual writers
Jewish Dutch scientists